The 1992 Australian Production Car Championship was a CAMS sanctioned motor racing title for drivers of Group 3E Series Production Cars. The title, which was the sixth Australian Production Car Championship was contested over an eight-round series with one race per round.

Calendar
 Round 1, Sandown, Victoria, 8 March
 Round 2, Winton, Victoria, 5 April
 Round 3, Symmons Plains, Tasmania, 26 April
 Round 4, Mallala, South Australia, 31 May
 Round 5, Oran Park, New South Wales, 21 June
 Round 6, Lakeside, Queensland, 5 July
 Round 7, Eastern Creek, New South Wales, 2 August
 Round 8, Mount Panorama, Bathurst, New South Wales, 3 October

Points system
Outright championship points were awarded on a 20–15–12–10–8–6–4–3–2–1 basis to the top ten finishers in each round.
Each driver could only retain his/her best seven round results.  
Class points for drivers of Under 2000cc Front Wheel Drive class cars were awarded on a 9-6-4-3-2-1 basis to the top six class finishers at each round.

Results

References

Further reading
 Australian Motor Racing Year, 1992/93, pages 168-185
 Official Programme, Mallala, 31 May 1992
 Official Programme, Mount Panorama, 4 October 1992, pages 108 & 109

Australian Production Car Championship
Production Car Championship